Soviet Wings Universal Sport Palace is an indoor sporting arena located in Moscow, Russia.  The capacity of the arena is 5,670, it was opened on December 2, 1980.  It is the home arena of the MHC Krylya Sovetov ice hockey team.

Sports venues completed in 1980
Indoor ice hockey venues in Russia
Indoor arenas built in the Soviet Union
Indoor arenas in Russia